The Ford Excursion is a heavy duty (Class 2), full-sized SUV that was produced by Ford. The longest and heaviest SUV ever to enter mass production, the Excursion was marketed as a direct competitor of the 2500-series (-ton) Chevrolet Suburban/GMC Yukon XL. Introduced on September 30, 1999 for the 2000 model year, a single generation was produced through the 2005 model year (a short 2006 model year was marketed for Mexico).

Derived from the F-250/F-350 Super Duty pickup truck, the Ford Excursion was almost exclusively sold in Canada and the United States; a limited number were sold for export. Following the discontinuation of the Excursion, Ford introduced the extended-length Ford Expedition EL/MAX; while matching the Chevrolet Suburban in terms of size, the Expedition EL/MAX shifted its chassis commonality from the Super Duty to the F-150.

Throughout its production run the Ford Excursion was assembled at the Kentucky Truck Plant in Louisville alongside Ford's Super Duty pickup trucks; the final example was produced on September 30, 2005.

Origin
For the 1973 model year, General Motors redesigned its Suburban utility wagon (sold by both Chevrolet and GMC). As a central part of the redesign, GM added a fourth passenger door to the model line for the first time; larger than the Jeep Wagoneer, the Suburban was able to compete directly against the similar-size International Harvester Travelall wagon for the first time. Following the 1975 discontinuation of the Travelall, the Suburban became the largest wagon-style full-size SUV (a distinction it would hold for the next 25 years).

For 1978, Ford introduced the second-generation Ford Bronco. To compete directly against the Chevrolet K5 Blazer/GMC Jimmy and Dodge Ramcharger, the Bronco became a full-size SUV, adopting the chassis and powertrain of the F-100 pickup truck (in line with its GM and Chrysler counterparts). Ford introduced the Bronco strictly as a three-door wagon with a lift-off hardtop (continuing the most popular design of its predecessor); in contrast, GM offered the Suburban alongside the Blazer/Jimmy, derived from crew-cab pickup truck bodywork. During the 1980s and early 1990s, Ford would market four-door Broncos built as license-built conversions (mating a Bronco body with F-Series crew cabs).

For 1991, Ford would produce its first wagon-style SUV, as it replaced the compact Bronco II with the Ford Explorer, introducing a five-door SUV alongside the previous three-door; both the Explorer and Bronco II were derived from the Ford Ranger compact pickup truck.

For 1997, Ford redesigned its F-150 SUV variant. To accommodate changing segment demands, the three-door (with lift-off hardtop) Bronco was replaced by the five-door Ford Expedition. While sized between the Chevrolet Tahoe and the Suburban, the Expedition was fitted with three-row seating (offered by the larger Suburban).

For 1999, Ford expanded the F-Series model range, with the F-250 and F-350 becoming the Super Duty series. Intended for work usage and towing, Super Duty F-Series trucks received a heavier-duty chassis and suspension along with a distinct body design. To compete against the 2500-series Suburban, Ford began the development of a heavy-duty SUV derived from the -ton F-250/1-ton F-350 Super Duty pickup truck, called the "Excursion".

Design overview

Chassis
The Ford Excursion was produced sharing the platform architecture of the F-250 Super Duty pickup truck. Alongside a shared 137-inch wheelbase (from the Super Cab, short bed), the Excursion shared common body and chassis assemblies with its F-250 counterpart. To allow for a common front and rear track width, the front suspension and most of the rear suspension were common components (the Excursion was fitted with its own leaf springs and front spring hanger bracket). The Excursion was fitted with a distinct frame (differing from the front sway bar mounts rearward), leaving the model taller and wider than its pickup truck counterpart.

The rear axle for all Excursions was a Sterling 10.5 axle. The four wheel drive models were equipped with a NV273 transfer case and Dana 50 front axle. Gear ratios of 3:73 and 4:30 were offered.

During the development of the chassis, Ford learned that its initial design caused smaller vehicles (such as a Ford Taurus) to become severely overridden in a head-on collision. In the test, the tire of the Excursion drove up to the windshield of the Taurus (reducing the chance of survival for its driver). As a response, Ford modified the chassis to include an under-bumper "blocker beam"; the device was initially tested by the French transportation ministry in 1971. For the rear of the chassis, Ford chose to include a trailer hitch as standard equipment in production to reduce underriding in rear-end collisions by smaller vehicles.

Powertrain 
During its entire production, the Excursion was offered with both gasoline and diesel engines. The standard gasoline engine was a 5.4 L Triton V8; a 6.8 L Triton V10 was offered as an option. At its launch, the optional diesel engine was the Navistar-produced 7.3 L Powerstroke V8; during 2003 production, a Navistar-produced 6.0 L diesel V8 was introduced, again using the Powerstroke name.

All four engines were paired with an automatic transmission. The 4-speed 4R100 automatic was fitted to the 5.4 L, 6.8 L, and 7.3 L engines, with a 5-speed 5R110W automatic fitted to the 6.0 L engine.

As its GVWR was above , the Excursion was exempt from EPA fuel economy ratings; reviewers cited fuel economy in the range of 12-15 Lmpg with the V10 gasoline engine.

While its GVWR exempted it from emissions standards applied to light-duty vehicles, Ford designed the powertrains of the Excursion to meet low-emissions vehicle (LEV) status.

Body design
While the smaller Ford Expedition shared design elements with the popular Ford Explorer, the Excursion adopted a high degree of commonality from its F-250 counterpart. With the exception of its egg-crate grille (styled similar to the Expedition and the third-generation Explorer), the Excursion shares its front bodywork forward of the B-pillars with its pickup-truck counterpart; the rear doors are specific to the model line (more curved rear edge than crew cab F-Series doors).

Styled similar to the 1980-1996 Bronco (with flush-mounted glass), the rear wagon body of the Excursion is fitted with a third-row seat. As with the Bronco, the spare tire was vertically-mounted in the cargo area. In place of a conventional liftgate, the rear cargo door was configured with a 3-way layout, pairing the upper lifting window (with rear wiper) with two lower dutch doors (a design similar to the 1992-2005 Chevrolet Astro). Larger taillamps were sourced from the Ford E-Series van.

During its production, the Excursion saw few major changes to its interior or exterior. For 2002, the instrument panel was updated, receiving a digital odometer and a transmission temperature gauge. For 2005, the egg-crate grille was replaced by the three-bar grille used on Super Duty trucks.

Coinciding with its design commonality with the Ford Super Duty crew cab, the Excursion was a mass-produced SUVs with four full-length passenger doors (along with the Ford Expedition MAX and Lincoln Navigator L, the Chevrolet Suburban and its GMC and Cadillac counterparts, the International Travelall, and the Jeep Wagoneer L and Grand Wagoneer L).

Trim 
The Excursion adopted the trim nomenclature adopted across Ford light trucks in North America. The base trim was XL (marketed nearly exclusively for fleet sales), XLT (standard trim in retail markets), and Limited (highest trim line). Following its use across many Ford light trucks, an Eddie Bauer trim package was introduced for the Excursion for 2003 (differing from the Limited primarily in appearance).

XLT: Included three rows of seating, leather-wrapped steering wheel with speed control, a security system, keyless entry,  chrome steel rims or optional alloy rims, trailer towing, and an AM/FM radio with cassette and single-disc CD player with six premium speakers, and air conditioning.

Limited: Included same features as XLT, but adds a power driver's seat, rear audio controls, illuminated running boards,  alloy rims, front-speed sensitive windshield wipers, five power points, ten cupholders, heated front seats, leather seats, and an optional rear entertainment system with DVD player.

Reception
Being launched on September 30, 1999, the 2000 Ford Excursion was described by Popular Science as the "biggest sport utility on the planet." This would be the most successful model year for the Excursion, with nearly 69,000 examples sold. After largely meeting sales projections at its launch, demand for the model line was affected by the energy crisis of the 2000s. While able to produce 70,000 examples yearly, sales from 2001 onward struggled to reach half of that capacity, becoming the lowest-selling SUV sold by Ford or Lincoln-Mercury.

The large size of the Excursion led to it being dubbed the Ford Valdez by the Sierra Club in 1999 (in reference to the Exxon Valdez supertanker). In 2007, Time selected it as one of the "Fifty Worst Cars of All Time".

Variants

F-250 Tropivan
From 1998 to 2012, a second-party SUV conversion of the Ford F-250 was sold in Brazil. Similar in design and layout to the Excursion, the F-250 Tropivan differed primarily in its being a second-party conversion (similar to the Centurion Classic). In contrast to the Excursion, two different wheelbases of the model were produced.

As with all Super Duty trucks in Brazil, the Tropivan had a different engine selection throughout its production run that included a 4.2 L Essex gasoline V6 and two types of diesels: a 3.9 L Cummins B-series and the 4.2 L straight-6 MWM Sprint 6.07TCA.

Aftermarket
During and since its production, the Excursion has become a basis for several types of aftermarket vehicles. As a result of its body commonality with the Super Duty model range, the bodywork of the Excursion led to aftermarket conversions of Ford medium-duty truck chassis (Ford F-650 and F-750) to SUVs; to accommodate the longer wheelbase, the body typically is fitted with an extra set of doors. At the other end of the size scale, the Hennessey VelociRaptor SUV was created by mating the rear bodywork of the Excursion with the bodywork of the first-generation Ford Raptor (a practice similar to the creation of the 1990s Centurion Classic C350). Other conversions involve fitting 2000-2005 Excursions with the front fascias of 2008-2016 Super Duty pickup trucks (as the Excursion shares its chassis with the F-250).

The Excursion also served as a basis for stretch limousines; coinciding with its heavier-duty chassis, many examples were stretched (unofficially) longer than the 120-inch limit imposed by Ford on the Lincoln Town Car sedan.

Yearly U.S. sales

References

External links

Excursion
Expanded length sport utility vehicles
All-wheel-drive vehicles
Cars introduced in 1999
2000s cars
Motor vehicles manufactured in the United States
Ford F-Series
Full-size sport utility vehicles